This page lists Prussian Ministers of the Interior.

Prussian Ministers of the Interior, 1808–1934
Count Alexander von Dohna-Schlobitten 1808–1810
Count Karl August von Hardenberg 1810–1814
Count Friedrich von Schuckmann 1814–1819
Baron Wilhelm von Humboldt 1819
Count Friedrich von Schuckman 1819–1834
Baron Gustav von Brenn 1834–1838
Gustav Adolf Rochus von Rochow 1838–1842
Count Adolf Heinrich von Arnim-Boitzenburg 1842–1845
Ernst von Bodelschwingh-Velmede 1845–1848
Alfred von Auerswald 1848
Friedrich von Kühlwetter 1848
Franz August Ecihmann 1848
Baron Otto Theodor von Manteuffel 1848–1850
Ferdinand Otto Wilhelm Henning von Westphalen 1850–1858 (brother-in-law to Karl Marx)
Eduard von Flottwell 1858–1859
Count Maximilian von Schwerin-Putzar 1859–1862
Gustav Wilhelm von Jagow 1862
Count Friedrich Albrecht zu Eulenburg 1862–1878
Count Botho zu Eulenburg 1878–1881
Robert von Puttkammer 1881–1888
Ludwig Herrfurt 1888–1892
Count Botho zu Eulenburg 1892–1894
Ernst von Koeller 1894–1895
Baron Eberhard Recke von der Horst 1895–1899
Baron Georg von Rheinbaben 1899–1901
Baron Hans von Hammerstein-Loxten 1901–1905
Theobald von Bethmann Hollweg 1905–1907
Friedrich von Moltke 1907–1910
Johann von Dallwitz 1910–1914
Friedrich Wilhelm von Loebell 1914–1917
Bill Drews 1917–1918
Paul Hirsch (SPD) 1918–1919
 Wolfgang Heine (SPD) 1919–1920
Carl Severing (SPD) 1920–1926
Albert Grzesinski (SPD) 1926–1930
Heinrich Waentig (SPD) 1930
Carl Severing (SPD) 1930–1932
Franz Bracht (Z/non-party) 1932–1933
Hermann Göring (NSDAP) 1933–1934

See also
Interior Ministers of Germany

Prussia
Interior